Watermark is a 2012 Canadian documentary film by Jennifer Baichwal and Edward Burtynsky. It concerns the history and use of water. Burtynsky was previously the subject of Baichwal's 2006 documentary, Manufactured Landscapes. The film features water use practices around the world, including multiple scenes in China and the United States, as well as segments shot in eight other countries. In China, the film chronicles the building of the Xiluodu Dam and flooding of its reservoir.

The film was recorded in various international locations using ultra-high-definition equipment, including a prototype RED Epic that was hand assembled.

The film won the Rogers Best Canadian Film Award at the 2013 Toronto Film Critics Association Awards, over The Dirties and Gabrielle and was named Best Feature Length Documentary at the 2nd Canadian Screen Awards in 2014.

References

External links
 
 Watermark at Mongrel Media

2013 films
2013 in the environment
2013 documentary films
Canadian documentary films
Documentary films about water and the environment
Films directed by Jennifer Baichwal
Best Documentary Film Genie and Canadian Screen Award winners
English-language Canadian films
2010s Canadian films